The 1810–11 United States Senate elections were held on various dates in various states. As these U.S. Senate elections were prior to the ratification of the Seventeenth Amendment in 1913, senators were chosen by state legislatures. Senators were elected over a wide range of time throughout 1810 and 1811, and a seat may have been filled months late or remained vacant due to legislative deadlock. In these elections, terms were up for the senators in Class 2.

The Democratic-Republican Party maintained their Senate majority. The minority Federalists had gone into the elections with such a small share of Senate seats (8 out of 34, or 23.5%) that, had they won all of the elections, they would still not have reached a majority.

Change in composition

Before the elections 
Composition after June 1810 special election in New Hampshire.

Result of the regular elections

Race summaries 

Except if/when noted, number following candidates is whole number votes.

Special elections during the 11th Congress 
In these special elections, the winners were seated during 1810 or before March 4, 1811; ordered by election date.

Races leading to the 12th Congress 

In these regular elections, the winner was seated on March 4, 1811 (except where noted due to late election); ordered by state.

All of the elections involved the Class 2 seats.

Special elections during the 12th Congress 
In these special elections, the winners were seated in 1811 after March 4; ordered by election date.

Connecticut (special)

Delaware

Delaware (regular)

Delaware (special)

Georgia

Kentucky

Massachusetts

Massachusetts (regular)

Massachusetts (special)

New Hampshire

New Hampshire (regular)

New Hampshire (special)

New Jersey

North Carolina

Ohio (special)

Rhode Island

Rhode Island (regular)

Rhode Island (special)

South Carolina

South Carolina (regular)

South Carolina (special)

Tennessee

Tennessee (regular)

Tennessee (special)

Virginia

See also
 1810 United States elections
 1810–11 United States House of Representatives elections
 11th United States Congress
 12th United States Congress

Notes

References

External links 
 Party Division in the Senate, 1789-Present, via Senate.gov